Geiger Engineering GmbH is a German aircraft engine manufacturer based in Seigendorf, Hirschaid, Oberfranken. The company specializes in the design and manufacture of electric aircraft engines and related systems, including batteries, electric controllers and aircraft propellers.

The company is a Gesellschaft mit beschränkter Haftung, a form of limited liability company.

Products
The HDP 10 is typical, a brushless 58 volt design producing  at 1950 rpm, with an outrunner coil at 93% efficiency. The company also produces inverters, aircraft motor instrumentation, system diagnostic, recording and monitoring equipment, electric paramotor system management controllers, battery accumulators as well as line and solar chargers.

Propeller designs include two and three bladed fixed pitch and ground adjustable propellers, folding and in-flight adjustable propellers.

Aircraft engines
Summary of aircraft engines built by Geiger Engineering:
Geiger HDP 10
Geiger HDP 12
Geiger HDP 13.5
Geiger HDP 16
Geiger HDP 25
Geiger HDP 32
Geiger HDP 50

See also
List of aircraft propeller manufacturers

References

External links

Aircraft engine manufacturers of Germany
Aircraft propeller manufacturers